Lobenstein may refer to:

People 
Joe Lobenstein (died 2015), English politician

Places 
Reuss-Lobenstein, a state located in the German part of the Holy Roman Empire 
Neundorf bei Lobenstein, a municipality in the district Saale-Orla-Kreis, in Thuringia, Germany
Bad Lobenstein, a town in the Saale-Orla-Kreis district, in Thuringia